Pisco Basin is a sedimentary basin extending over  in southwestern Peru.

The oldest known sediments are the Eocene sandstones of the Caballas Formation, while the youngest deposits, the fossiliferous Pisco Formation, date to the Early Pleistocene. In relation to present-day, topography the fill of Pisco Basin makes the upper part of the Coastal Cordillera of southern Peru, the coastal plains, the Ica-Nazca Depression and the Andean foothills.

The basin is renowned for hosting various highly fossiliferous stratigraphic units; the Pisco Formation has provided a wealth of marine mammals (including sloths), birds, fish and other groups, as have the Chilcatay, Otuma and Yumaque Formations.

Stratigraphy

Tectonic and sedimentary evolution 
The basin developed in a setting of extensional tectonics from Eocene to the Late Miocene with short-lived episode of basin inversion in the Middle Miocene. Late Pliocene and Pleistocene uplift of the basin may be consequence of the subduction of Nazca Ridge.

Sedimentary strata of the basin shows evidence for a series of marine transgressions during the last 50 million years. These marine transgressions occurred in a sequence 41-34 Ma, 31-28 Ma, 25-16 Ma, 15-11 Ma, 10-5 Ma, and 4-2 Ma. The end of most of the marine transgressions is thought to be associated either with global sea level falls or compressional events in the Andes.

Oligo-Miocene transgression 
The marine Oligo-Miocene (25–16 Ma) marine transgression is evidenced by a series of sedimentary strata containing fossils of marine diatoms, Peruchilus snails and Pitar and Cucullaea clams. Oligo-Miocene marine environments in the Pisco Basin range from littoral to shelf. Moquegua Basin southeast of Pisco Basin appear to have been unaffected by the transgression.

Within the Andean margin contemporary marine transgressions are also known from southern Chile, Patagonia and Colombia. As such the marine transgression is thought to represent a regional phenomenon with the steadily rising central Andes being an exception.

Paleontology

Pisco Formation

Chilcatay Formation

Otuma Formation

Paracas Group

Yumaque Formation

See also 
 Arauco Basin, Chile
 Altiplano Basin, Peru, Chile, Bolivia
 Caldera Basin, Chile
 Cocinetas Basin, Colombia
 Urumaco Formation, Venezuela

Notes and references

Notes

References

Bibliography 

Stratigraphy

Geology publications

Paleontology publications

Further reading 
Chilcatay Formation
 
 
 
 

Paracas Group
 

Pisco Formation
 
 
 
 
 
 
 
 
 
 
 
 
 
 

Sedimentary basins of Peru
Forearc basins
Paleogene Peru
Neogene Peru
Paleontology in Peru
Basins